Shinnik Bobruisk  was an ice hockey team in Bobruisk, Belarus. The team competed in the Belarusian Extraliga (BXL) from 2008 to 2011.

External links
Team profile on eurohockey.com

Ice hockey teams in Belarus
Belarusian Extraleague teams